Juan Rodrigo Camacho (born June 4, 1959) is a retired male long-distance runner from Bolivia, who represented his native country in three consecutive Summer Olympics, starting in 1984. He set his personal best (2:17.49) in the men's marathon on April 7, 1984 in Maassluis, Netherlands.

Achievements
All results regarding marathon, unless stated otherwise

References
 Profile

1959 births
Living people
Bolivian male marathon runners
Athletes (track and field) at the 1984 Summer Olympics
Athletes (track and field) at the 1988 Summer Olympics
Athletes (track and field) at the 1992 Summer Olympics
Olympic athletes of Bolivia